Avenging Force is a 1986 American action film directed by Sam Firstenberg.  The screenplay was written by James Booth, who co-starred in the film. It was originally intended as a sequel to the 1985 film Invasion U.S.A., which starred Chuck Norris in the role of Matt Hunter. In Avenging Force, Hunter (played by Michael Dudikoff) faces off against a group of far-right extremists known as the Pentangle.

Plot
In the swamps of the Louisiana bayou, two men are hunted and killed by four costumed, well-armed adversaries.

A retired US Secret Service agent, Captain Matt Hunter, has retired to his family's cattle ranch in Louisiana and Texas, with his sister Sarah and grandfather. They drive to New Orleans and meet Matt's old military comrade and local politician Larry Richards, who is now running for US Senate. At dinner, Larry hesitantly mentions threats made against his life during the election cycle, which he dismisses as harmless. Later that day, Larry, Matt and their families ride in Larry's float in the Mardi Gras parade. Disguised as revelers, assassins open fire on Larry's float, accidentally killing his eldest son. Matt and Larry take down the attackers, but Matt loses the last assassin in charge in the crowd.

Matt calls in a favor to his old boss, Admiral Brown, and learns the perpetrators are members of an organization known to US intelligence as the Pentangle. Taking the name of the five-pointed star, the Pentangle is a far-right group promoting extreme views on gun rights, immigration, and security whose leadership is suspected of operating a hunting club targeting people. The Secret Service suspects the cult to be composed of businessmen and authority figures with connections to Washington and to be run by five members, each represented by a point on the star, but it lacks further knowledge and asks Matt to infiltrate the organization to gain further intelligence. Matt declines because of his family, and but he sends his and Larry's family to hide out at his ranch.

Meanwhile, Matt and Larry intentionally foil a second trap set by the Pentangle, which eliminates several more assassins in a dockyard confrontation.

Professor Elliott Glastenbury is the head of Glastenbury Industries and the leader of the Pentangle. He takes personal interest in Matt after he reviews surveillance of the botched Richards hit, Pentangle's first failure. The members Wade Delaney, Jeb Wallace, and Charles Lavall considers asking Matt to join.

Learning that the families are hiding out at Matt's ranch, Glastenbury orders Delaney, Wallace, and Lavall to attack the ranch, kill the Secret Service agents and Matt's grandfather, and set the ranch ablaze. Matt, Sarah, and Larry's wife all escape, and Larry goes back to rescue his youngest son but is shot in the process. As Matt saves them both, Larry asks Matt to protect his son and dies. Meanwhile, Pentangle finds Sarah and Larry's wife hiding outside, takes Sarah hostage, and executes Larry's wife.

Matt attempts to escape via the roof with Larry's son but is shot in the leg while he falls to the ground. The Pentangle gives Matt two weeks to agree to be hunted, or it will kill Sarah. Before leaving, it executes Larry's youngest son in front of an injured Matt.

Two weeks later, Matt shows up to a Cajun bayou party at which the Pentangle members are guests. Matt finds Sarah about to be auctioned off by the brothel as a sex slave. He rescues her, which attracts the Pentangle's attention, but escapes into the swamps on foot. The Pentangle hunts him throughout the night, but one by one, Matt eliminates Lavall, Wallace, and Delaney until only Glastenbury remains. Ambushed by Glastenbury, Matt stabs him, which allows both men time to escape, with Matt taking Sarah to Brown for treatment and protection.

Matt then confronts Glastenbury at his mansion. Declining his offer to join the Pentangle, both duel with Glastenbury's collection of antique weaponry around them. Glastenbury appears to have the upper hand, but Matt impales him on one of his own statues and kills him. Matt goes to the hospital to see Sarah, where Brown congratulates him on a job well done. Matt confronts him that only the Secret Service knew that the families were hiding out on Matt's ranch and so someone in the Service is connected to the Pentangle, which strongly implying that Brown is the unnamed fifth member of the Pentangle's membership. Matt vows to continue fighting the Pentangle and leaves.

Cast 

 Michael Dudikoff as Captain Matt Hunter 
 Steve James as Larry Richards 
 James Booth as Admiral Brown 
 Bill Wallace as Wade Delaney
 John P. Ryan as Professor Elliott Glastenbury
 Karl Johnson as Commander Jeb Wallace
 Marc Alaimo as Charles Lavall 
 Allison Gereighty as Sarah Hunter

Release

Theatrical
Avenging Force received a theatrical release in the United States on September 12, 1986, opening at the RKO National Twin in New York City, New York, and other theaters.

Home media
Avenging Force was released on VHS and Betamax by Media Home Entertainment. In 2014, the film was released on DVD and Blu-ray in the US by Kino Lorber.

Reception

Critical response
Nina Darnton, in her review of the film for The New York Times, wrote, "The heros themselves, the movie tirelessly points out, are kind men with strict codes of honor and intense personal loyalties. [...] The enemy is unambiguously bad. These kinds of movies are not strong on subtlety." She compared Dudikoff to "a young Clint Eastwood, though Mr. Dudikoff, a former Adidas model, is more agile than Dirty Harry ever was." The Washington Posts Paul Attanasio also noted a perceived lack of subtlety in the film, and wrote that its action sequences are "orchestrated by director Sam (Doctor Ninja) Firstenberg with his usual panache."

References

External links 

 
 
 
Avenging Force at Facemelting Films

1986 films
1986 independent films
1986 action films
1986 martial arts films
1980s English-language films
American action films
American independent films
American sequel films
American martial arts films
Films about terrorism in the United States
Films directed by Sam Firstenberg
Films scored by George S. Clinton
Films set in New Orleans
Films shot in Los Angeles
Films shot in New Orleans
Golan-Globus films
Films produced by Menahem Golan
Films produced by Yoram Globus
1980s American films